Lufa Farms is an urban agricultural company located in the Ville Saint-Laurent neighborhood of Montreal, Quebec. The company states its mission on its website is to grow food where people live and grow it more sustainably. The company, founded in 2009, has installed commercial greenhouses on the rooftops of several large industrial buildings in the greater Montreal area.

Description 
Lufa Farms believes that the current food system is unsustainable and that cities need to transition to a new food production model that is s self-sufficient enough to continue to feed a growing metropolitan population. The company achieves this by growing more food closer to where people live, while using less space and resources to minimize environmental impacts and remaining completely transparent.

With three rooftop greenhouses in the Montreal area, the company currently has 138,000 square feet of growing space where dozens of types of vegetables are grown. The company currently delivers around 20,000 baskets every week to over 500 pick-up points across Quebec, and in 2020, upon completion of their fourth greenhouse, the 164,000-square-foot space will enable them to feed up to 2% of Montreal households.

History 
The company was started by Mohamed Hage, who had observed rooftop gardens in Lebanon. Also involved in the founding were Lauren Rathmell, Kurt Lynn, and Yahya Badran.

Lufa Farms opened its first commercial rooftop greenhouse in the Ahuntsic borough of Montreal. The greenhouse had 31,000 square feet of vegetable production and houses the company's herb, micro-greens, cucumber, and pepper production using both horizontal and vertical farming systems.

2011 
The company harvested its first rooftop vegetables and began delivering weekly baskets to its first cohort of clients, aptly named "Lufavores" (a contraction between 'Lufa' and 'locavore'). At that time, the company grew only 40 varieties of vegetables and delivered them to about 200 customers without the option to customize the order. The baskets were delivered steps from customer's doors thanks to a network of neighborhood pick-up points (PUPs).

2013 
Lufa Farms built their second rooftop greenhouse in the neighboring city of Laval, measuring 43,000 square feet and currently housing the company's tomato and eggplant production. In order to offer more variety, they partnered with hundreds of local farmers and food makers to offer Lufa Farms' rooftop-grown vegetables, as well as thousands of seasonal field fruit and vegetables, baked-to-order bread, seafood, and more. These partnerships brought the launch of the company's online farmers’ market, the Marketplace.

2016 
The company went through a period of growth. The total number of weekly baskets exceeded 10,000 and the company subsequently doubled its workforce. It was also the year that Lufa Farms' eco home delivery by electric car was launched and the company became cash-flow positive.

2017 
Lufa Farms built its third rooftop greenhouse in the Anjou suburb of Montreal. This greenhouse, which was both their largest and most technologically advanced, grew the company's growing space to 138,000 square feet and allowed the company to expand production capacity to include more than one hundred varieties of vegetables, and feed over 10,000 Montreal households year-round.

2019 
The company outgrew their Ahuntsic location, and moved their main offices and distribution centre to Ville Saint-Laurent where they began construction on their fourth, and largest rooftop greenhouse.

2020 
The company is forecasting the completion of their Ville Saint Laurent greenhouse for the spring of 2020. Once finished, it will become the world's largest rooftop greenhouse at 164,000 square feet (about three football fields) and will house the company's complete tomato and eggplant production. The surface area will be greater than all three of their current greenhouses combined and will double the company's growing capacity, allowing them to feed up to 2% of Montreal households with local vegetables.

Farming techniques 
Lufa Farms grows its crops on rooftops. In the summer, natural plant transpiration cools the greenhouse and consequently helps to mitigate the heat island effect produced by black tar rooftops. In its operations, it uses a coconut fiber substrate using a hydroponic system. Water is recirculated and rain and meltwater are added into the closed-loop system.

Lufa Farms does not use synthetic herbicides, fungicides, or pesticides. It relies primarily on bio-controls consisting of the introduction of predatory insects.

Green waste is composted and sold on Lufa Farms' Marketplace or is sent to municipal or other partner composting sites.

Gallery

See also 
 Controlled-environment agriculture
 Urban agriculture
 Roof garden
 Building-integrated agriculture
 Hydroponics

References

External links 

 Official Website
 Lufa Farms at TEDx Talks

Agriculture in Quebec
Articles containing video clips
Agriculture companies of Canada
Companies based in Montreal
2009 establishments in Quebec
Canadian companies established in 2009